The Finnish Air Force (FAF or FiAF;) is one of the branches of the Finnish Defence Forces. Its peacetime tasks are airspace surveillance, identification flights, and production of readiness formations for wartime conditions. The Finnish Air Force was founded on 6 March 1918.

History
The Finnish Air Force, one of the oldest air forces of the world, pre-dates the British RAF (founded as an independent entity on 1 April 1918) and the Swedish  (founded on 1 July 1926). The first steps in the history of Finnish aviation involved  Russian aircraft. The Russian military had a number of early designs stationed in the Grand Duchy of Finland, which until the Russian Revolution of 1917 formed part of the Russian Empire. Soon after the  Finnish declaration of independence of 6 December 1917, the Finnish Civil War of January to May 1918 broke out, in which the Soviets sided with the Reds – the socialist rebels with ties to  Lenin's Bolshevik Party. Finland's White Guard, the Whites, managed to seize a few aircraft from the Soviets, but were forced to rely on foreign pilots and aircraft. Sweden refused to send men and materiel, but individual Swedish citizens came to the aid of the Whites. The editor of the Swedish newspaper , Valdemar Langlet, bought a N.A.B. Albatros aircraft from the Nordiska Aviatik A.B. factory with funds gathered by the  organization. This aircraft, the first to arrive from Sweden, was flown via Haparanda on 25 February 1918 by Swedish pilot John-Allan Hygerth (who on 10 March became the first commander of the Finnish Air Force) and Per Svanbäck. The aircraft made a stop at Kokkola and had to make a forced landing in Jakobstad when its engine broke down. It was later given the Finnish Air Force designation F.2 ("F" coming from the Swedish word "", meaning "aircraft").

Insignia of the Finnish Air Force (1918–1945)

Swedish count Eric von Rosen gave the Finnish White government its second aircraft, a Thulin  Typ D. Von Rosen, one of the founding members of the Nationalsocialistiska Blocket ("National Socialist Bloc"), a Swedish National Socialist political party, and later brother-in-law to Hermann Goering, had painted his personal good-luck charm on the Thulin Type D aircraft. This logo – a blue swastika, the ancient symbol of the sun and of good luck, which was back then still used with non-political connotations – gave rise to the insignia of the Finnish Air Force. The white circular background originated when the Finns painted over the advertisement from the Thulin air academy. The swastika was officially taken into use after an order by Commander-in-Chief C. G. E. Mannerheim on 18 March 1918. The FAF changed its aircraft insignia, which resembled the swastika of the Third Reich, after 1944 due to an Allied Control Commission decree, which prohibited fascist organizations. It nevertheless continues to feature in some unit emblems, unit flags and decorations, including on uniforms. In 2020, the BBC reported that the FAF had "quietly stopped" using the symbol in the emblem of the Air Force Command.

First aircraft
The von Rosen aircraft received the designation F.1. Its pilot, Lieutenant Nils Kindberg, flew the aircraft to Vaasa on 6 March 1918, carrying von Rosen as a passenger. As this gift ran counter to the policy of the Swedish government, and no flight permit had been granted, Sweden fined Kindberg 100  Swedish crowns for leaving the country without permission. The F.1 aircraft is considered by some to be the first aircraft of the Finnish Air Force, which did not exist during the Civil War, while the Red side flew a few aircraft with the help of some Russian pilots. The F.1 aircraft was destroyed in an accident which killed its crew, not long after it had been handed over to the Finns. On 7 September 1920, two newly-purchased Savoia flying boats crashed in the Swiss Alps en route to Finland, killing all on-board (three Finns and one Italian). This day has since become the memorial day for fallen pilots.

The Finnish Air Force assigns the  matriculation numbers to its aircraft by assigning each type a two-letter code following by dash and an individual aircraft number. The two-letter code usually refers to the aircraft manufacturer or model, such as HN for F/A-18 Hornet, DK for Saab 35 Draken, VN for Valmet Vinka etc.

Finnish Civil War, January to May 1918

Air activity of the Reds
The Whites occupied most of the airbases that the Russians left in Finland after the Russian pilots had returned to Russia.

The Reds possessed a few airbases and a few Russian aircraft, mainly amphibious aircraft – they had 12 aircraft in all.  The Reds did not have any pilots themselves, so they hired some of the Russian pilots who had stayed behind.  On 24 February 1918 five aircraft arrived at Viipuri, and were quickly transferred to Riihimäki.

The Reds established air units in Helsinki, Tampere, Kouvola, and Viipuri.  There were no overall headquarters, but the individual units served under the commanders of the individual front lines.  A flight school was set up in Helsinki, but no students were trained there before the fall of Helsinki.

Two of the aircraft, one reconnaissance aircraft (Nieuport 10) and one fighter aircraft (Nieuport 17) that had arrived at Riihimäki were sent to Tampere, and three to Kouvola.  Four Russian pilots and six mechanics also arrived at Tampere.  The first war sortie was flown on 1 March 1918 over Naistenlahti.

It seems likely that the Reds also operated two aircraft over the Eastern front.  The Reds mainly performed reconnaissance, bombing sorties, spreading of propaganda leaflets, and artillery spotting. The Reds' air activity was not particularly successful. Their air operations suffered from bad leadership, worn-out aircraft, and un-motivated Russian pilots. Some of the aircraft were captured by the Whites, while the rest were destroyed.

Air activity of the Whites
In January 1918 the Whites did not have a single aircraft, let alone pilots, so they asked the Swedes for help. Sweden, a neutral country, could not send any official help. Sweden also forbade its pilots to aid Finland.

Despite this official stance, however, one Morane-Saulnier Parasol, and three N.A.B. Albatros arrived from Sweden by the end of February 1918.  Two of the Albatross aircraft were gifts from private citizens supporting the White Finnish cause, while the third was purchased. It was initially intended that the aircraft would support the air operations of the Whites, but the aircraft ultimately proved unsuitable.

Along with aircraft shortages, the Whites also did not have any personnel, so all the pilots and mechanics also came from Sweden.  One of the  Finnish Jägers, Lieutenant Bertil Månsson, had received pilot training in  Imperial Germany, but he stayed behind in Germany, trying to secure further aircraft deals for Finland.

During the Civil War the White Finnish Air Force consisted of:

 29 Swedes (16 pilots, two observers and 11 mechanics). Of the pilots, only 4 had received military training, and one of them operated as an observer.
 2 Danes (one pilot, one observer)
 7 Russians (six pilots, one observer)
 28 Finns (four pilots – of whom two had military training, six observers, two engineers and 16 mechanics).

The air activity consisted mainly of reconnaissance sorties.  The Germans brought several of their own aircraft, but they did not contribute much to the overall outcome of the war.

The first  air-force base of independent Finland was founded on a lake shore near Kolho.  The base could operate three aircraft.  The first aircraft arrived by rail on 7 March 1918, and on 17 March 1918 took off from the base for the first time.  In 1918 the Finns took over nine Russian Stetinin M-9 aircraft that had been left behind.

The first air operation of the Whites during the war was flown over  Lyly. It was a reconnaissance-gathering mission as the front-line moved south. As the line neared Tampere, the base moved first to Orivesi and then to Kaukajärvi near Tampere. The contribution of the White air force during the war was almost insignificant.

From 10 March 1918 the Swedish Lt. John-Allan Hygerth led the Finnish Air Force. He was however replaced on 18 April 1918, due to his unsuitability for the position and numerous accidents. The German Captain Carl Seber took over the role and commanded the air force from 28 April 1918 until 13 December 1918.

By the end of the Civil War the Finnish Air Force had 40 aircraft, of which 20 had been captured from the Reds (the Reds did not operate this many aircraft, but some had been found abandoned on Åland). Five of the aircraft had been flown by the  Allies from Russia, four had been gifts from Sweden and eight had been bought from Germany.

Winter War (1939–1940)

 
The Winter War began on 30 November 1939, when the Soviet Air Force bombed 21 Finnish cities and municipalities. The Soviet Union had an estimated  5,000 aircraft in 1939, and of these, some 700 fighters and 800 medium bombers came to the Finnish front to support the Red Army's operations. As with most aerial bombardments in the early stages of World War II, the damage to Finnish industry and railways was quite limited.

At the beginning of the Winter War the Finnish Air Force was equipped with only 18 Bristol Blenheim bombers and 46 fighters (32 modern Fokker D.XXIs and 14 obsolete Bristol Bulldogs). There were also 58 liaison aircraft, but 20 of these were only used for messengers.  The most modern aircraft in the Finnish arsenal were British-designed and -built Bristol Blenheim bombers. The primary fighter aircraft, the Fokker D.XXI, featured a cheap but maneuverable design with fabric-covered fuselage and fixed landing-gear. On paper, the Finnish air assets should have been no match for the attacking Soviet Red Air Force. However, the Finnish Air Force had already adopted the finger-four formation in the mid-1930s, which proved a much more effective formation than the Vic formation that many other militaries continued to use in 1939.

To prevent their aircraft from being destroyed on the ground, the Finns distributed their aircraft to many different airfields and hid them in the nearby forests. The Finns constructed many decoys and built shrapnel-protection walls for the aircraft. Soviet air-raids on Finnish airfields usually caused little or no damage as a result, and often resulted in interception of the attackers by the Finns as the Soviet bombers flew homeward.

As the war progressed, the Finns tried desperately to purchase aircraft wherever they could. This policy resulted in a very diverse aircraft inventory, which caused some major logistical problems until the inventory became more standardized. The Finnish Air Force included numerous American, British, Czechoslovakian, Dutch, French, German, Italian, Soviet, and Swedish designs. Other countries, like South Africa and Denmark,  sent aircraft to assist in the Finnish war effort. Many of these purchases and gifts did not arrive until the end of the hostilities, but would see action later during the  Continuation and  Lapland wars.

To make up for its weaknesses (few and obsolete fighters) the FAF mainly focused on attacking enemy bombers from directions that were disadvantageous to the enemy. Soviet fighters were usually superior in firepower, speed and agility, and Finnish pilots avoided them unless the enemy was in a disadvantageous position.

As a result of these tactics, the Finnish Air Force managed to shoot down 218 Soviet aircraft during the Winter War while losing only 47 to enemy fire. Finnish anti-aircraft guns also had 314 confirmed downed enemy planes. 30 Soviet planes were captured – these were "kills" that landed more or less intact within Finland and were quickly repaired.

Continuation War (1941–1944)

 
The Finnish Air Force found itself better prepared when the Continuation War against the Soviet Union started in 1941. It had been considerably strengthened and consisted of some 550 aircraft, though many were considered second-rate and thus "exportable" by their countries of origin. Finland purchased a large number of aircraft during the Winter War, but few of those had reached service during the short conflict. Politics had also played a role, since  Hitler did not wish to antagonize the Soviet Union by allowing aircraft exports through German-controlled territory during the Winter War. In addition to Fokker fighters and Bristol Blenheim bombers built under license, new aircraft types were in place by the time hostilities with Soviet Union resumed in 1941. Small numbers of Hawker Hurricanes arrived from the United Kingdom, Morane-Saulnier M.S.406s from France, Fiat G.50s from Italy, and one liaison aircraft. Numerous Brewster F2A Buffaloes from the neutral USA strengthened the FAF. A few dozen  Curtiss Hawk 75s captured by the Germans in France and Norway were sold to Finland when Germany began warming up its ties with Finland. Finns reconditioned captured Tupolev SBs, Ilyushin DB-3s, and Polikarpov I-153s for service.

The FAF proved capable of holding its own in the upcoming battles with the Red Air Force. Older models, such as the Fokker D.XXI and Gloster Gladiator, had been replaced with new aircraft in front-line combat units.

The FAF's main mission was to achieve air superiority over Finnish-held territory and to prevent Soviet air power from reinforcing the Red Army's front lines. The fighter squadrons proved very successful in the Finnish offensive of 1941. A stripped-down, more manoeuvrable, and significantly lightened version of the American Brewster Buffalo was the FAF's main fighter until 1943. Results with this fighter were very good, even though the type was considered to be a failure in the US Navy and with British and Dutch Far East forces. In Finnish use, the Brewster had a victory rate of 32:1 – 459 kills to 15 losses. German Bf 109s replaced the Brewster as the primary front-line fighter of the FAF in 1943, though the Buffalos continued in secondary roles until the end of the fighting.  Other types, including the Italian Fiat G.50 and Curtiss Hawk 75, also proved capable in the hands of well-trained Finnish pilots. The principle reconnaissance type was the German Arado Ar 196, which had been purchased in 1943 and continued to serve throughout the war, though by mid-1944 the planes' pre-war roots were showing and were subsequently modified to a later A-5 model in an attempt to stave off obsolescence. Various Russian designs also saw action when lightly damaged "kills" were repaired and made airworthy.

Dornier Do 17s (received as a gift from Hermann Göring in 1942) and Junkers Ju 88s improved the bombing capability of the Finnish Air Force. The bomber force was also strengthened with a number of captured Soviet bombers, which had been taken in large numbers by the Wehrmacht during Operation Barbarossa. The bomber units flew assorted missions with varying results, but a large part of their time was spent in training, waiting until the time came to use the aircraft. Thus the bomber squadrons of Flying Regiment 4 were ready for the summer battles of 1944, which included for example the Battle of Tali-Ihantala (June to July 1944).

While the FAF was successful in its mission, conditions were not easy. Spare parts for the FAF planes were scarce — parts from the US (Buffalo and Hawk), Britain (Hurricanes), and Italy (G.50) were unavailable for much of the war. Repairs took often a long time, and the State Aircraft Factory was burdened with restoration/repair of captured Soviet planes and of foreign aircraft with many hours of flight time, and with the development of indigenous Finnish fighter types. Also, one damaged bomber took up workshop space equalling three fighters.

Finland was required to expel or intern remaining German forces as part of its  peace agreement with the Soviets in September 1944.  As a result, the Finns' fought their final air battles against retreating Luftwaffe units.

The Finnish Air Force did not bomb any civilian targets during either war. Curiously, overflying Soviet towns and bases was also forbidden, as to avoid any unneeded provocations and to spare equipment.

The Finnish Air Force shot down 1,621 Soviet aircraft while losing 210 of its own aircraft during the Continuation War.

After World War II

See also The Finnish Air Force 1944–60

The end of World War II in 1945 and the  Paris peace talks of 1947 brought about some limitations imposed on the FAF. For example, the Finnish Air Force could have:

 no more than 60 combat aircraft
 no aircraft with internal bomb-bays
 no guided missiles or atomic weapons
 no weaponry of German construction or using German parts
 a maximum strength of 3,000 persons
 no offensive weapons

These revisions followed Soviet demands closely. When Britain, fearing that the provisions only augmented Soviet air-defences, tried to vary some of the conditions, the Soviets opposed such proposals. The revisions were again revised in 1963, and Finland was allowed to buy guided missiles and a few bombers that were used as target-tugs. The FAF also used a loop-hole to strengthen its capabilities by purchasing large numbers of two-seater aircraft, which counted as trainer aircraft and were not included in the revisions. These aircraft could have secondary roles.

During the Cold War years ( to ), Finland tried to balance its purchases between east, west and domestic producers. This led to a diverse inventory of Soviet, British, Swedish, French and Finnish aircraft. After leading Finnish politicians held unofficial talks with their Swedish counterparts, Sweden began storing surplus Saab 35 Drakens, intended for transfer to Finland in the event of a war against the Soviet Union. This practice continued until the 1980s.

On 22 September 1990, a week before the unification of Germany, Finland declared that the limiting treaties were no longer active and that all the provisions of the Paris Peace Treaties were nullified.

In the 1990s, with the Cold War over, the Finnish Air Force ended its policy of purchasing Soviet/Russian aircraft and replaced the Saab Draken and MiG-21s in its fighter wing with US F/A-18C/D Hornets.

 the FAF is organized into three Air Commands, each assigned to one of Finland's three air-defence areas. The main Wing bases are at Rovaniemi, Tampere and Kuopio-Rissala, each with a front-line squadron. Pilot training takes place at the Air Force Academy in Tikkakoski, with advanced conversion performed at squadron level.

HX Fighter Program

The current Hornet fleet is set to begin being phased out from 2025, and to be completely decommissioned by 2030. The Finnish MoD initiated its Hornet replacement programme in June 2015, and named it the "HX Fighter Program". A working group was created and it identified suitable aircraft.

The final decision for choosing the new Air Force jet is based on five key considerations, which are the multi-role fighter's military capability, security of supply, industrial cooperation solutions, procurement and life cycle costs, and security and defence policy implications. An extensive questionnaire had been sent out the producers asking what their products can offer Finland in form of capabilities, cost, security of supply and the domestic industry's role, as well as security and defence policy impacts.

The goal is to retain the numerical strength of the FAF fighter fleet, which means that the goal is to obtain some 64 aircraft. The MoD has estimated that the programme will cost somewhere between 7–10 billion Euros.

In December 2015 the Finnish MoD sent a letter to Britain, France, Sweden and the US informing them that the fighter project had been launched in the Defence Forces. The request for information concerning the HX Fighter Program was sent in April 2016. Responses were received from all five participants in November 2016. The official Request for Quotation was sent in the spring of 2018. The goal is to start the fighter candidates’ environmental testing in Finland in 2019. The buying decision took place in 2021.

On 10 December 2021, it was announced that Lockheed Martin F-35A Lightning II was the winner of the HX program. It was also revealed that both Rafale and Typhoon had not gone through to the final round. 

The aircraft are planned to be delivered between 2026 and 2030, and is expected to replace the F/A-18s during the period 2028–2030. The F-35s are intended to be in service until the 2070s. The FAF expects the annual operating costs not to exceed , which are the current operating costs for the F/A-18 fleet. The first weapons package will include AIM-9X Block II+ Sidewinder and AIM-120C-8 AMRAAM missiles, and later on air-to-ground weaponry will be obtained when they reach sufficient maturity and will match their shelf life with the introduction of the aircraft. The air-to-ground package might consist of GBU-53/B SDB II bombs, GBU-31 JDAM bombs, JSM and AGM-158B-2 JASSM-ER missiles, which all were offered in the deal. The DSCA notification also mentioned BLU-117, BLU-111 and BLU-109 bombs, as well as AGM-154C-1 Joint Stand Off Weapons (although the latter is unlikely as production is ending after 2023).

Aircraft

Current inventory 

Note: Three C-17 Globemaster III's are available through the Heavy Airlift Wing based in Hungary.

Armament

Organization

 

The Air Force is organised into three air commands, each of which operates a fighter squadron. In addition, the Air Force includes a number of other units:

 Air Force General Staff, in Tikkakoski
 Air Force Command (AFCOMFIN), at Jyväskylä–Tikkakoski Air Base
 Air Operations Centre, at Jyväskylä–Tikkakoski Air Base
 Lapland Air Command, at Rovaniemi Air Base
 Fighter Squadron 11 (Hävittäjälentolaivue 11, HävLLv 11)
 1st Flight, with F-18C/D
 2nd Flight, with F-18C/D
  Communication Flight, with PC-12 NG
 5th Sector Operations Center
 Base Support Squadron
 C4I Center
 Maintenance Center
 Karelia Air Command, at Kuopio Air Base
 Fighter Squadron 31 (Hävittäjälentolaivue 31, HävLLv 31)
 Headquarters Flight
 1st Fighter Flight, with F-18C/D
 2nd Flight, with F-18C/D
 3rd Flight, with F-18C/D
 Communication Flight, with PC-12 NG
 7th Sector Operations Center
 Base Support Squadron
 C4I Center
 Maintenance Center
 Satakunta Air Command, at Tampere-Pirkkala Air Base
 Air Operations Support Squadron
 Headquarters Flight
 Flight, with CASA C-295M, Learjet 35A/S
 Base Support Squadron
 C4I Center
 Maintenance Center
 Air Force Academy, at Jyväskylä–Tikkakoski Air Base
 Fighter Squadron 41, with Hawk Mk 51/51A, 61
 Headquarters Flight
 1st Flight, with Hawk Mk.51, Mk.51A, Mk.66
 2nd Flight, with Hawk Mk.51, Mk.51A, Mk.66
 3rd Flight, with Hawk Mk.51, Mk.51A, Mk.66
 Communication Flight, with PC-12 NG
 Training Center, with Grob G 115E
 Training Battalion
 Air Force Reserve Officer School
 Air Force NCO School
 Signal Technology Company
 Air Traffic Engineer Company
 Base Support Squadron
 C4I Center
 Maintenance Center
 Air Force Band

War Time Strength 
 2x F-18C squadrons
 1x Hawk squadron
 1x Air Operations Support squadron
 4x Stand-by bases
 4x Communication flights

Total strength is 38,000.

Commanders

See also
List of military aircraft of Finland
List of World War II aces from Finland
List of air forces

References

Citations

Sources
 Green, William and Gordon Swanborough. "Annals of the Gauntlet". Air Enthusiast Quarterly, No. 2, n.d., pp. 163–176.  
 Guest, Carl-Fredrick. "Talkback". Air Enthusiast, No. 18, April – July 1982. pp. 78–79. .
 
 
 Silvester, John. "Call to Arms: The Percival Sea Prince and Pembroke". Air Enthusiast, No. 55, Autumn 1994, pp. 56–61.

External links

 
 Pictures of Finnish Air Force aircraft at Airliners.net

 
Military units and formations established in 1918
Aviation in Finland
1918 establishments in Finland